Lake Volney is a lake in Le Sueur County, in the U.S. state of Minnesota.

Lake Volney was named for Volney J. Brockway, an early settler.

References

Lakes of Minnesota
Lakes of Le Sueur County, Minnesota